Pardosa groenlandica is a species of wolf spider in the family Lycosidae. It is found in Russia, Canada, the United States, and Greenland.

References

External links

 

groenlandica
Articles created by Qbugbot
Spiders described in 1872